Arato is a reservoir located in the Inderta woreda of the Tigray Region in Ethiopia. The earthen dam that holds the reservoir was built in 1997 by SAERT.

Dam characteristics 
 Dam height: 20 metres
 Dam crest length: 443 metres
 Spillway width: 20 metres

Capacity 
 Original capacity: 2 590 000 m³
 Dead storage: 647 698 m³
 Reservoir area: 40 ha

Irrigation 
 Designed irrigated area: 120 ha
 Actual irrigated area in 2002: 27 ha

Environment 
The reservoir suffers from rapid siltation. The lithology of the catchment is Antalo Limestone and Mekelle Dolerite. Part of the water that could be used for irrigation is lost through seepage; the positive side-effect is that this contributes to groundwater recharge.

References 

Reservoirs in Ethiopia
1997 establishments in Ethiopia
Tigray Region